The International News Service (INS) was a U.S.-based news agency (newswire) founded by newspaper publisher William Randolph Hearst in 1909. In May 1958 it merged with rival United Press to become United Press International.

History 
Established two years after Hearst-competitor E.W. Scripps combined three smaller syndicates under his control into United Press Associations, INS battled the other major newswires. It added a picture service, International News Photos, or INP. The Hearst newsreel series Hearst Metrotone News (1914–1967) was released as International Newsreel from January 1919 to July 1929. Universal Service, another Hearst-owned news agency, merged with International News Service in 1937. Always a distant third to its larger rivals the Associated Press and the United Press, INS was merged with UP on May 24, 1958, to become UPI.

New York City's all-news radio station, WINS, then under Hearst ownership, took its call letters from INS, as did the short-lived (1948–49), DuMont Television Network nightly newscast, I.N.S. Telenews.

Among those who worked for INS were future broadcasters William Shirer, Edwin Newman, Bob Clark, Freeman Fulbright, and Irving R. Levine, who in 1950 covered the outbreak of war in Korea for INS. Marion Carpenter, the first woman national press photographer to cover Washington, D.C. and the White House, and to travel with a US President, also had worked for the INS.

International News Service v. Associated Press
During the early years of World War I, Hearst's INS was barred from using Allied telegraph lines, because of reporting of British losses.  INS made do by allegedly taking news stories off AP bulletin boards, rewriting them and selling them to other outlets. AP sued INS and the case reached the United States Supreme Court.

The case was considered important in terms of distinguishing between upholding the common law rule of "no copyright in facts", and applying the common law doctrine of misappropriation through the tort of unfair competition. In International News Service v. Associated Press of 1918, Justice Mahlon Pitney wrote for the majority in ruling that INS was infringing on AP's "lead-time protection", and defining it as an unfair business practice. Pitney narrowed the period for which the newly defined proprietary right would apply: this doctrine "postpones participation by complainant's competitor in the processes of distribution and reproduction of news that it has not gathered, and only to the extent necessary to prevent that competitor from reaping the fruits of complainant's efforts and expenditure." Justice Louis D. Brandeis wrote a minority opinion, objecting to the court's creating a new private property right.

INS Poll 
Between 1952 and 1957, members of the International News Service conducted an annual college football poll, similar to those held by rivals at the Associated Press (AP Poll) and United Press (Coaches Poll). Every week during the football season, a group of experts and writers issues a list of the top 10 teams of that week, culminating in a national champion awarded at the end of the season, before the bowl games. The poll ceased after INS merged with UP in 1958.

References

Further reading
Harnett, Richard M. and Billy G. Ferguson, UNIPRESS: United Press International--Covering the 20th Century, Fulcrum Publishing, 2003

External links

 (Report on United Press International/INS merger)

News agencies based in the United States
Organizations established in 1909
1909 establishments in the United States